The River Wolves is a 1934 British crime film directed by George Pearson and starring Helga Moray, Michael Hogan and John Mills.

Cast
 Helga Moray as Moira Clare  
 Michael Hogan as Captain Guest  
 John Mills as Peter Farrell  
 Ben Welden as Flash Lawson  
 Hope Davey as Heather Patton  
 Martin Walker as Trevor Rowe  
 Norman Shelley as Jim Spiller  
 D.J. Williams as Tod  
 Mark Daly as Jock Brodie  
 Edgar Driver as George  
 Barbara Everest

References

Bibliography
 Low, Rachael. Filmmaking in 1930s Britain. George Allen & Unwin, 1985.
 Wood, Linda. British Films, 1927-1939. British Film Institute, 1986.

External links

1934 films
1930s English-language films
1934 crime films
British crime films
Films shot at Twickenham Film Studios
Films set in London
British black-and-white films
1930s British films